Claudia Isăilă (born 17 July 1973) is a Romanian female former track and field athlete who competed in the javelin throw.

After a fifth place finish at the 1990 World Junior Championships in Athletics, Isăilă emerged two years later with a  bronze medal at the 1992 European Athletics U23 Cup then a gold medal at the 1992 World Junior Championships in Athletics. She made the final at the 1993 World Championships in Athletics a year later, ending the competition in seventh place. A silver medal came at the 1995 Summer Universiade behind her compatriot Felicia Țilea. She was a finalist at the 1994 European Athletics Championships and represented Romania one further time globally at the 1995 World Championships in Athletics, though she did not progress beyond qualifying.

International competitions

National titles
Romanian Athletics Championships
Javelin: 1995

References

External links

Living people
1973 births
Romanian female javelin throwers
World Athletics Championships athletes for Romania
Universiade silver medalists for Romania
Universiade medalists in athletics (track and field)
Competitors at the 1997 Summer Universiade
Medalists at the 1995 Summer Universiade